Licon is a surname. Notable people with the surname include:

Jeffrey Licon (born 1985), American actor
Will Licon (born 1994), American competition swimmer

See also
Licona
Licon Dairy

Spanish-language surnames